Pera may refer to:

Places
 Pera (Beyoğlu), a district in Istanbul formerly called Pera, now called Beyoğlu
 Galata, a neighbourhood of Beyoğlu, often referred to as Pera in the past
 Pêra (Caparica), a Portuguese locality in the district of Setúbal
 Pera (San Giovanni di Fassa), an Italian hamlet in the municipality of San Giovanni di Fassa, in Trentino
 Pêra (Silves), a Portuguese parish in the district of Faro in the Algarve
 Pera Orinis, a village in Cyprus

Other uses
 Pera (surname)
 The Pera, a ship of the Dutch East India Company
 Peda or Pera, a dessert in Pakistan and India
 Pera (plant), a plant genus in the family Peraceae
 Public Employees Retirement Association, the name of several public employee pension plans in the United States
 Peripheral ERA, a baseball statistic
 Purdue Enterprise Reference Architecture
 perA, a mycotoxin biosynthesis gene